Dynamite is a high explosive.

Dynamite may also refer to:

Film and television
AEW Dynamite, a professional wrestling television program by All Elite Wrestling (AEW)
Dynamite Fighting Show, a professional kickboxing television program by Cătălin Moroșanu
Dynamite (1929 film), an American pre-Code drama film
Dynamite (1947 film), a Swedish crime film 
Dynamite (1949 film), an American film noir drama film
Dynamite (2015 film), an Indian Telugu action thriller film

Food
Dinamita, a stuffed whole pepper in spring roll wrappers in Filipino cuisine
Dynamite, a sandwich similar to a Sloppy joe popular in New England

Music

Albums
Dynamite (The Supremes and the Four Tops album), 1971
Dynamite (Stina Nordenstam album), 1996
Dynamite (Jamiroquai album), or the title song (see below)
Jermaine Jackson (album), released internationally as Dynamite
Dynamite (Ike & Tina Turner album), 1963
Dyna-Mite, a 2018 album by Jon Cleary

Songs
"Dynamite" (Afrojack song), 2014
"Dynamite" (BTS song), 2020
"Dynamite" (Desert Dolphins song), 1994
"Dynamite" (Jamiroquai song), 2005
"Dynamite" (fight song), the official fight song of Vanderbilt University
"Dynamite" (Liza Fox song), 2014
"Dynamite" (Taio Cruz song), 2010
"Dynamite" (Westlife song), 2019
"Dynamite!" (song), by Stacy Lattisaw
"Dynamite (Sean Paul song)", 2021, featuring Sia
 "Dynamite!", a 1999 song by The Roots
"Dyna-mite", a 1973 song by Mud
"Dynomite" (song), a 1975 song by Bazuka
"Dynamite", a 1957 song by Brenda Lee co-written by Mort Garson and Tom Glazer
"Dynamite (Cliff Richard and the Shadows song)", 1959
"Dynamite", a song by Christina Aguilera from the album Keeps Gettin' Better: A Decade of Hits
"Dynamite", a song by Jermaine Jackson from his self-titled 1985 album, Jermaine Jackson
"Dynamite", a song by Junior Senior from the 2003 album D-D-Don't Don't Stop the Beat
"Dynamite", a song by Nause
"Dynamite", a song by Rod Stewart from the album Out of Order
"Dynamite", a song by Runner from their 1979 self-titled album
"Dynamite", a song by the Scorpions from their 1982 album Blackout
"Dynamite", a song by Shinee from the album Dream Girl – The Misconceptions of You
"Dynamite", a song by VIXX from the album Zelos
"Dynamite", a 2016 song by Adore Delano

People 
 Dynamite Kid (1958–2018), English professional wrestler
 Roberto Dinamite (1954–2023), Brazilian footballer and politician
 Ryan Day (snooker player) (born 1980), snooker player nicknamed Dynamite

Print media 
 Dynamite Entertainment, an American comic book company
 Dynamite (magazine), a children's magazine published by Scholastic Corporation from 1974 to 1992

Other
Dynamite, Washington
Dyna-Mite, a fictional character in the Marvel Comics Universe, now named Destroyer
DynaMite (Bratz), a doll collection from the fashion doll brand
Dynamite!!, a mixed martial arts and kickboxing event held annually at New Year's in Japan
Dynamite, a 1988 board game by Parker Brothers
"Dyn-o-mite!", the catchphrase of J.J. Evans (Jimmie Walker) on the 1970s sitcom Good Times
Dynamite AC, an association football club from Haiti
Dynamite Fighting Show, a Romania-based kickboxing and martial arts promotion
Groupe Dynamite, clothing retailer
Dynamite (Freizeitpark Plohn), a roller coaster
PCB Dynamites, a Pakistani women's cricket team